Stay Lucky is a British television comedy-drama series ran from 8 December 1989 to 6 August 1993. Made by Yorkshire Television and screened on the ITV network, it starred Jan Francis and Dennis Waterman.

Plot
Drama about a small-time gangster Thomas Gynn (Dennis Waterman) from London who discovers a new life up north in Yorkshire.

Helping widowed, self-sufficient businesswoman Sally Hardcastle (Jan Francis) when her car breaks down on the motorway, Thomas reluctantly accepts an offer of a lift to Leeds.

Over the coming months, the two become involved in a series of misadventures that soon find them being drawn closer together.

Cast
Dennis Waterman as Thomas Gynn
Jan Francis as Sally Hardcastle
Emma Wray as Pippa 
Niall Toibin as John Lively
Susan George as Samantha Mansfield 
Ian McNeice as Franklyn Bysouth 
Leslie Ash as Jo Blake 
Dougary Scott as Alex 
Willie Ross as Barney Potter 
Chris Jury as Kevin 
James Grout as Ken Warren
Lou Hirsch as Monty 
Mac McDonald as Vinny

Others include Paul Chapman, Belinda Lang, Rula Lenska, Amanda Noar and Rosemary Martin.

Episodes

Series 1 (1989)

Series 2 (1990)

Series 3 (1991)

Series 4 (1993)

Locations
 Clarence Dock, Leeds, West Yorkshire, England, UK (Series 1 – Sally's boatyard)
 Canal Basin, Sowerby Bridge, West Yorkshire, England, UK (Series 2 and 3 – Sally's boatyard)
 Armley Mills Industrial Museum, Armley, Leeds, West Yorkshire, England, UK (Series 4 – The Yorkshire Industrial Museum)

External links
 Dennis Waterman – Museum website.
 

1980s British drama television series
1990s British drama television series
1989 British television series debuts
1993 British television series endings
English-language television shows
ITV television dramas
Television shows set in West Yorkshire
Television shows scored by John Powell
Television series by ITV Studios
Television series by Yorkshire Television